Tashi Paljor, Dilgo Khyentse Rinpoche (c. 1910 – 28 September 1991) was a Vajrayana master, scholar, poet, teacher, and recognized by Buddhists as one of the greatest realized masters. Head of the Nyingma school of Tibetan Buddhism from 1988 to 1991, he is also considered an eminent proponent of the Rime tradition.

As the primary custodian of the teachings of Jamyang Khyentse Wangpo, Dilgo Khyentse was the de facto custodian of the vast majority of Tibetan Buddhist teachings. He taught many eminent teachers, including the Dalai Lama. After the Chinese invasion of Tibet, his personal effort was crucial in the preservation of Tibetan Buddhism.

Biography

Early life, ancestry
He was born in 1910 in the Denhok Valley at Kham Derge, Eastern Tibet, to a family directly descended from the ninth-century King Trisong Detsen. His father was a minister to the King of Derge. When he was seven years old, he was publicly recognized as one of the reincarnations of Jamyang Khyentse Wangpo by Shechen Gyaltsap Rinpoche (1871–1926) at Shechen, one of the six principal monasteries of the Nyingmapa school. During the next few years Dilgo Khyentse received full schooling from various tutors, in addition to training in meditation, and in the study of the dharma in general, and of tantra specifically.

His root guru was Shechen Gyaltsap Rinpoche, and Dzongsar Khyentse Chokyi Lodro (1893–1959) was his other main spiritual master. After he completed what is known as the Preliminary Practices (Ngöndro), Khyentse spent most of the next 13 years in silent retreat in remote hermitages and caves near his birthplace.

He married Khandro Lhamo, a woman from a modest family, after he became ill following an austere retreat. His teacher had prophesied that a cure for his illness would be marriage, despite the fact he was uninterested in it. Lhamo became a well-known expert in Tibetan medicine, a supporter of Shechen Monastery and his life-long companion.

Buddhist studies
Dilgo Khyentse spent 20 years in retreat. After completing a retreat at the age of 28, Khyentse spent many years with Dzongsar Khyentse Chokyi Lodro. After receiving from Khyentse Chokyi Lodro the many empowerments of the Rinchen Terdzo (the collection of Revealed Treasures or termas), Dilgo Khyentse requested to spend the rest of his life in solitary meditation. But Khyentse Chokyi Lodro answered, "The time has come for you to teach and transmit to others the countless precious teachings you have received."

Additionally he received teachings at Palpung Monastery from the 11th Tai Situ Rinpoche, and full instruction on the ancient Guhyagarbha Tantra and its various commentaries from Khenpo Tubga at Kyangma Ri-tro. In all he studied with over 50 teachers from the various oral and practice lineages of Tibetan Buddhism.

Later on, the Dalai Lama regarded Dilgo Khyentse as his principal teacher in the Nyingma tradition and of Dzogchen. Khyentse was also one of the main teachers of Chögyam Trungpa, whom he held in high regard. Dilgo Khyentse was also a master to teachers from all four schools of Tibetan Buddhism.

Move to central Tibet, teachings
In the 1950s, as rebellions broke out in Kham in response to the imposition of Chinese Communist rule, Khyentse and his family escaped to central Tibet, leaving behind his library of dharma books and most of his own writings. Then in 1959, after the 14th Dalai Lama left Tibet, Khyentse, his family and a few disciples left Tibet, including his brother, the 9th Sangye Nyenpa Rinpoche and Tenga Rinpoche, and headed for Bhutan. The royal family of Bhutan invited him to stay there and teach, and he became their advisor.

Later, as he made frequent visits to give teachings to the 14th Dalai Lama at Dharamasala in India, he began giving teachings all over the Himalayas, India, Southeast Asia and the West. He also engaged in scholarship and composed numerous poems, meditation texts and commentaries. He was a terton (a discoverer of spiritual treasures) and was considered to have discovered numerous termas. He was one of the leading masters of the pith-instructions of Dzogchen, the Great Perfection, and one of the principal holders of the Longchen Nyingtik tradition.

In 1980, he founded the Shechen Tennyi Dargyeling Monastery in Nepal, where he transplanted the Shechen tradition to a new home near the great stupa of Boudhanath, just northeast of Kathmandu. There he gave many teachings over the years to hundreds of other lamas, disciples, and students from around the world. His senior student is Trulshik Rinpoche, whom he named as his spiritual heir. Over this same period, and until his paranirvana in 1991, Khyentse was involved in publishing as many Tibetan Buddhist teachings as possible, over 300 volumes altogether.

Final years
He was one of the few Tibetan Lamas accorded the honorific title "His Holiness". Following the death of Dudjom Rinpoche in 1987, he became the head of the Nyingma School, and remained so until his death in Bhutan on 28 September 1991.

Student Matthieu Ricard remarked

Final cremation ceremonies were held for him over a three-day period near Paro in Bhutan, in November 1992 and were attended by over 100 lamas, the Royal Family and ministers of Bhutan, 500 western disciples and 50,000 devotees.

Preservation of lineages

Dilgo Khyentse Rinpoche was a perfect example of a Ri-me master. He was instrumental in safeguarding all of the lineages of Tibetan Buddhism without partiality. He received and gave empowerments, wrote volumes of texts that revitalized and interpreted important transmission teachings.

Gyatrul (b. 1924), in a purport to Karma Chagmé (fl. 17th century), conveys Khyentse's 'samaya' (Sanskrit), diligence and humility in receiving 'wang' (Tibetan), lineal transmission and 'rlung' (Wylie) as rendered into English by B. Alan Wallace:

Dilgo Khyentse Yangsi Rinpoche

The Dilgo Khyentse Yangsi, formally named Ugyen Tenzin Jigme Lhundrup (Tib. ཨོ་རྒྱན་བསྟན་འཛིན་འཇིགས་མེད་ལྷུང་གྲུབ་, Wylie o rgyan bstan 'dzin 'jigs med lhun grub), was born on 30 June 1993 in Nepal which was then celebrated as Guru Rinpoche's birthday. His father is Tsikey Chokling Rinpoche, the son of Tulku Urgyen Rinpoche, and his mother is Sangyum Dechen Paldon. His siblings are Phakchok Rinpoche, Mingyur Paldron, and Kelsang Bhuti. 

Trulshik Rinpoche is said to have had numerous visions concerning the Yangsi, which he shared with Shechen Rabjam Rinpoche, Dilgo Khyentse's grandson. His recognition was also confirmed by the 14th Dalai Lama. On 29 December 1995 Trulshik Rinpoche performed the Yangsi's formal name offering ceremony, in Nepal. Dilgo Khyentse Yangsi Rinpoche was enthroned in 1997. Shechen Rabjam Rinpoche personally supervised the upbringing of Dilgo Khyentse Yangsi Rinpoche, in Nepal.

In 2010, Dilgo Khyentse Yangsi Rinpoche marked the century anniversary of the birth of Kyabje Dilgo Khyentse Rinpoche, and his own 17th year, with celebrations in Nepal and Bhutan and with a major tour of Europe, North America, and Asia. The tour began in France at La Sonnerie in the Dordogne, since La Sonnerie is the main European seat of Dilgo Khyentse, and is the French seat of Dudjom Rinpoche.

Afterwards, Khentse Yangsi Rinpoche visited and gave teachings at Lerab Ling, before continuing with Shechen Rabjam Rinpoche and Matthieu Ricard to the U.S., Canada and Mexico. The North American tour included events in New York state, in Boulder, Colorado, and in Vermont before heading to Canada and Mexico.

In 2014, Dilgo Khyentse Rinpoche and Matthieu Ricard gave talks and teachings in France and in the U.K.. At Nyima Dzong in Paris, an empowerment was given for the Dilgo Khyentse Terma of Vajra Vidharana (Dorje Namjon), and Dilgo Khyentse Rinpoche celebrated his birthday. Afterwards, teachings were given at Lerab Ling and at Chanteloube. In the U.K., talks were given at Rigpa London, and a series of talks and empowerments were given at the newly opened Buddhist Community Centre UK in Aldershot, hosted by the Nepali Buddhist Community.

Later in July 2014, Dilgo Khyentse Rinpoche returned to Mexico and to his center Shechen Mexico, and held two talks and gave a teaching on Rangjung Pema Nyingtik ngondro practice. In Toronto, Canada, at Riwoche gompa, Dilgo Khyentse Rinpoche gave empowerments on Namgyalma and Vajrakilaya.

Film
The film Spirit of Tibet: Journey to Enlightenment, The Life and World of Dilgo Khyentse Rinpoche was released in 1998.  It was made by Matthieu Ricard (French photographer, Buddhist monk, and author) who had traveled with Khyentse for 14 years. It tells Khyentse's story from birth to death, to rebirth, and of his escape following China's invasion of Tibet to his determination to preserve and transmit Buddhist teachings far and wide. The film reveals Tibet's art, ritual philosophy, and sacred dance. Along with rarely photographed areas of Tibet, Bhutan and Nepal, the film features interviews with the Dalai Lama, who speaks about his own spiritual life.

The film Brilliant Moon: Glimpses of Dilgo Khyentse Rinpoche, written and directed by Neten Chokling, and narrated by Richard Gere and Lou Reed, uses animation, previously unseen archival footage and photos along with new interviews of Tibet's teachers to tell Khyentse's life story.

Publications

 .
 .
 .
 .
 .
 .
 .
 .
 .
 .
.

References

Sources

External links

 Dilgo Khyentse Fellowship – Shechen
 Biography of Dilgo Khyentse Tashi Peljor at The Treasury of Lives
 Longchen Foundation Founded by Dilgo Khyentse Rinpoche and Chögyam Trungpa Rinpoche
 Dilgo Khyentse Rinpoche – Rigpa Wiki

20th-century Buddhists
Bhutanese Buddhists
1910 births
1991 deaths
20th-century lamas
Bhutanese Buddhist spiritual teachers
Deaths in Bhutan
Khyentse incarnations
Dzogchen lamas
Nyingma lamas
Rimé lamas
Rinpoches
Tertöns
Tibetan Buddhists from Tibet